John Buster Burrell (born November 22, 1940) is a former American football wide receiver in the National Football League for the San Francisco 49ers, the Pittsburgh Steelers, and the Washington Redskins. He played college football at Rice University and was drafted in the seventh round of the 1962 NFL Draft.  Burrell was also selected in the 25th round of the 1962 AFL Draft by the Dallas Texans.

References

1940 births
Living people
American football wide receivers
Pittsburgh Steelers players
Rice Owls football players
San Francisco 49ers players
Washington Redskins players
Players of American football from Fort Worth, Texas